Hunstrete Lake  is a mature lake of . It is surrounded by a belt of trees, and at the north-west end this merges into Lord's Wood, Pensford.

The lakes are used for angling, and are noted for their carp and tench.

Biodiversity

The lake is a breeding site for great crested grebe; there is also a large breeding population of common toad.  A number of bat species have also been recorded at the site including the common pipistrelle Pipistrellus pipistrellus, soprano pipistrelle Pipistrellus pygmaeus, noctule Nyctalus noctula, Daubenton's bat Myotis daubentonii and lesser horseshoe bat Rhinolophus hipposideros.

The scarce violet helleborine orchid is found in small quantities in the woodland along the north edge of the first pond to the west of the main lake.

References

Bibliography

 Susan Elizabeth Caola. 2003 Hunstrete, Truth and Legend – the story of a country estate 

Bath and North East Somerset
Lakes of Somerset